New Norway is a hamlet located in central Alberta, Canada within Camrose County.

New Norway is home to a number of small businesses, and has an elementary and secondary school, local fire protection and municipal services provided by Camrose County.

History 
In 1892, travelling first on the newly constructed Canadian Pacific Railway (CPR) line, the Ole M. Olstad family disembarked in Wetaskiwin and made their way to the Duhamel settlement, which had been established for some years. The family quickly filed Dominion Lands Act homesteads a few miles south for themselves and several relatives and friends in the United States. In addition, they purchased available CPR land for $3.00 per acre ($7.41/ha).

For a time the area was known as the "Olstead District". However, as other Norwegian families (along with those of other nationalities) settled in the area, the name changed to New Norway around 1895. By 1903 the fledgling community had a school, general store, and a blacksmith shop to its credit.

In the fall of 1909, in anticipation of the new Grand Trunk Pacific rail line being built nearby, the community was moved (by the use of skids and seven oxen) to its present location NW-11-45-21-W4 (see Dominion Land Survey). According to the Camrose Canadian, the townsite of New Norway was put on sale on October 14, 1909, with 14 businesses filing an intent to establish within the first month. Commercial lots sold from $100 to $250, and residential lots were priced from $50 to $150.

New Norway incorporated as a village on May 6, 1910, and its first council was elected on May 9, 1910, with Norman M. Smith, James F. Willows and Evan O. Olstad serving.

Over a century later, the Village of New Norway was dissolved to hamlet status under the jurisdiction of Camrose County effective November 1, 2012.

Demographics 

See also 
List of communities in Alberta
List of former urban municipalities in Alberta
List of hamlets in Alberta

References 

 Memory Opens the Door - New Norway and District 1972. (Local History book, no ISBN)

2012 disestablishments in Alberta
Camrose County
Designated places in Alberta
Former villages in Alberta
Hamlets in Alberta
Populated places disestablished in 2012
Norwegian Canadian settlements